Portugal competed at the 1964 Summer Olympics in Tokyo, Japan. 20 competitors, 19 men and 1 woman, took part in 20 events in 7 sports.

Athletics

Men's 100m:
 José Fernandes da Rocha — 1st round: 4th (heat G)

Men's 200m:
 José Fernandes da Rocha — 1st round: 5th (heat H)

Men's 1500m:
 Manuel F. Oliveira — 1st round: DNS (heat C)

Men's 3000m Steeplechase:
 Manuel F. Oliveira — 4th (8.36,2)

Men's 5000m:
 Manuel F. Oliveira — 1st round: DNS (heat D)

Men's Marathon:
 A. R. Aldegalega — 44th (2:38.02,2)

Equestrian

Men's Individual Jumping:
 Henrique Alves Calado — 34th (−58,25 points)
 Joaquim Duarte Silva — 5th (−20,00 points)

Gymnastics

Women's Individual All-Round Competition:
 Esbela Fonseca — 68th (69,763 points)
 Vault — 18,133
 Asymmetrical Bars — 16,699
 Balance Beam — 17,499
 Floor — 17,432

Judo

Men's Middleweight (68 – 80 kg):
 Fernando Costa Matos — 1st round: 2nd (group 8)

Sailing

Finn:
 Hélder de Oliveira — 19th (2591 points)

Star:
 Duarte de Almeida Bello and Fernando Pinto Coelho Bello — 8th (3330 points)

Dragon:
 Joaquim Pinto Basto, Eduardo Guedes de Queiroz and Carlos Ferreira — 16th (1804 points)

Shooting

Four shooters represented Portugal in 1964.

25 m pistol
 José Manuel Carpinteiro — 45th (552 marks)

50 m pistol
 Manuel da Costa — 58th (580 marks)

Trap
 Armando Marques — 18th (188 marks)
 Guy de Valle Flor — 28th (186 marks)

Swimming

Men's 100m Freestyle:
 Herlander Ribeiro — 1st round: 6th (heat 3)

Men's 200m Butterfly:
 Vitor Manuel Fonseca — 1st round: 5th (heat 1)

Men's 400m Medley:
 António Basto — 1st round: 7th (heat 2)

Officials
 Correia Leal (chief of mission)

References

External links
Official Olympic Reports

Nations at the 1964 Summer Olympics
1964
1964 in Portuguese sport